is a Japanese model and actress. She is a former member of 9nine.

Biography
On March 1, 2005, Miura was a new model for the teen magazine, Hanachu, and later  on January 31, 2009.

In September 2005, she was a member of 9nine, and left in August 2010.

From July 1, 2013, Miura became a member of Our Songs Creative of K-Dash.

Filmography

Drama

Variety

Other TV series

Films

Theater

Advertisements

Internet distributions

References

External links
 Official profile 
  

Japanese female models
21st-century Japanese actresses
Japanese idols
1992 births
Living people
Actors from Fukushima Prefecture
Models from Fukushima Prefecture